The Tanjung Kling Power Station is one of the oldest power stations operating in Malaysia. It went into commercial operation on 6 August 1999 and is located in Tanjung Kling, Malacca. The station is a thermal combined-cycle gas turbine plant.

See also
 List of power stations in Malaysia

References

1999 establishments in Malaysia
Buildings and structures in Malacca
Central Melaka District
Natural gas-fired power stations in Malaysia
Oil-fired power stations in Malaysia
20th-century architecture in Malaysia